Sawla is a small town in the Savannah Region of Ghana. It is also the capital of Sawla-Tuna-Kalba district.

Transport

Train
Sawla is on the route of a proposed railway to Hamile.

Climate

References 

Populated places in the Savannah Region (Ghana)